The New York Women's House of Detention was a women's prison in Manhattan, New York City which existed from 1932 to 1974.

Built on the site of the Jefferson Market Prison that had succeeded the Jefferson Market in Manhattan's Greenwich Village, the New York Women's House of Detention is believed to have been the world's only art deco prison.  It was designed by Sloan & Robertson in 1931 at a cost of $2,000,000 and opened to the public by Richard C. Patterson, Jr. on March 29, 1932.  It did not receive its first inmates until some time later.  Its location at 10 Greenwich Avenue gave the women inmates an opportunity to try to communicate with people walking by. After the prison was officially closed on June 13, 1971, Mayor Lindsay began the demolition of the prison in 1973, and it was completed the following year. It was replaced with a garden.

Ruth E. Collins was the first superintendent at the prison.  She embraced the design of the prison, labeling it "a new era in penology".  Her mission was to effect the moral and social rehabilitation of the women in her charge, giving them a chance for "restoration as well as for punishment".  She commissioned a number of art works as part of her mission to uplift the women and treat them all as individuals. Among the Women's House of Detention's most famous inmates were:

 Polly Adler
 Jane Alpert
 Angela Davis
 Dorothy Day
 Andrea Dworkin
 Miriam Moskowitz
 Ethel Rosenberg
 Afeni Shakur

In its later years, allegations of racial discrimination, abuse and mistreatment dogged the prison. Angela Davis has been outspoken about the treatment she witnessed. Andrea Dworkin's testimony of her assault by two of the prison's doctors led to its eventual closing. Audre Lorde described the House of Detention as, "a defiant pocket of female resistance, ever-present as a reminder of possibility, as well as punishment."

In 2022, the historian Hugh Ryan published a history of the prison called The Women's House of Detention: A Queer History of a Forgotten Prison. He writes, "It was one of the Village's most famous landmarks: a meeting place for locals and a must-see site for adventurous tourists. And for tens of thousands of arrested women and transmasculine people from every corner of the city, the House of D was a nexus, drawing the threads of their lives together in its dark and fearsome cells."

Pop culture 
Hellhole: The Shocking Story of the Inmates and Life in the New York House of Detention for Women, published in 1967 by Sara Harris, recounts her time as a social worker in the prison, and the shocking scenes she witnessed. 

Jerry Herman's Off-Broadway musical, Parade, opened in 1960 and featured a song called "Save the Village", originally entitled “Don’t Tear Down the House of Detention.” The musical, Ain't Supposed to Die a Natural Death, which opened on Broadway in 1972 features a song, "10th and Greenwich" and is considered the first lesbian love song in Broadway history.

The prison featured prominently in the 2004 film House of D.

See also

References

1932 establishments in New York City
1974 disestablishments in New York (state)
Art Deco architecture in Manhattan
Defunct prisons in New York City
Government buildings in Manhattan
History of women in New York City
New York City Department of Correction
Women's prisons in New York (state)